Goriber Bou is a 1990 Bangladeshi social-drama film directed by Kamal Ahmed. Renowned film actress Shabana produced the film her own banner S.S. Productions. The film stars Alamgir, Shabana, Manna, Aruna Biswas leading role and more.

At the 15th Bangladesh National Film Awards, it won Best Film, Best Director, Best Male Playback Singer (for Syed Abdul Hadi), Best Cinematography, and Best Editing (jointly).

Cast 
 Alamgir
 Shabana
 Manna
 Aruna Biswas
 Anwara Begum

Music
Goriber Bou films music is directed by Subal Das. Song written by Masud Karim. Sung by Sabina Yasmin, Andrew Kishore, Runa Laila.

Soundtrack

Awards
Goriber Bou won the following awards:

References

External links
 

1990 films
Bengali-language Bangladeshi films
Films scored by Subal Das
1990s Bengali-language films
Films directed by Kamal Ahmed (director)
Best Film National Film Award (Bangladesh) winners